Matthew Corker (born 30 November 1982) is a professional rugby union player for Richmond RFC. Hailing from Broadstairs, Kent and playing rugby from a young age, Corker formerly played for London Wasps and London Welsh.

His early playing career began playing for Chatham House Grammar School in Ramsgate where he progressed up to being captain of the 1st XV. Whilst at Chatham House, he played for local rugby side Thanet Wanderers and developed his game.

After completing his A-Levels he joined the University of Bath studying chemistry and while at the University of Bath he gained international recognition with the England Universities side. His debut for England Universities came on Sunday 30 January 2005 against Australia Universities at Clifton RFC in Bristol. England ran out 18-11 winners and Corker completed a full 80 minutes at second row in the victory. At university Corker also played for the 1st XV in the BUCS (British Universities Sports Association) Premier Men's South Division A.

Corker stands at  (1.98 m) 17 st 6 lb (111 kg) and played for a number of teams whilst finishing his course at university, including Havant RFC in the Powergen London League during the 2003–04 season.

Corker joined London Wasps in the summer of 2005 on completion of his studies and made his debut in a pre-season friendly against the Exeter Chiefs at The Causeway Stadium, Exeter on Sunday 7 August 2005. Corker came on as a substitute and helped the London Wasps to a 70–26 victory over their opponents in front of 2,147 spectators.

On Friday 1 December 2006 Corker played in Wasps 26–15 defeat by Saracens at Vicarage Road, coming on as a second-half substitute for Richard Birkett. The match, in the first round of the EDF Energy Cup marked the return of England's 2003 Rugby World Cup winning flanker Richard Hill returning for Saracens.

References

External links
Wasps profile

Living people
1982 births
Wasps RFC players
People from Broadstairs
Alumni of the University of Bath
People educated at Chatham House Grammar School